Glitoris (a portmanteau of "glitter" and "clitoris") are a four-piece punk rock band from Canberra ACT, Australia. The band is composed of Keven 007 (vocals and guitar), Malcolm (bass), Mickey (drums) and Andrew (lead guitar).

Glitoris are known for their use of punk rock sounds and utilisation of humorous and political subject matter in their lyrics. The group occasionally incorporate multi-layered vocal harmonies into their sound and usually perform in vivid costumes and make up. Their fanbase are known as the Gliterati. The band are popular amongst the LGBTQI+ community and often speak out on matters of gender and sexual equality.

History

2014-2016: Formation and first EP
The band, initially comprising Tony (Drums), Sophie Chapman (Bass) and Keven 007 (vocals and guitar) began as a one-off protest band/gig in 2014 where they played in the local festival ‘You Are Here’ fully naked and covered in glitter.’ The show sold out and they decided to continue. In late 2014, they recruited Andrew on lead guitar.

In 2015, Glitoris recorded their 4-track debut ‘The Disgrace at Infidel Studios, Queanbeyan. Sophie left Glitoris in 2015 and the band recruited Malcolm on bass.

In September 2016, the band signed to Buttercup Records and released The Disgrace.

Later in 2016, the band headlined Art Not Apart's Sound and Fury show, were special guests on Regurgitator's Human Distribution tour and in December 2016, they won Best Live Act (ACT) at the National Live Music Awards of 2016.

2017-2019: "Trump Card" and The Policy
On 20 January 2017, Glitoris released a single "Trump Card" in protest at the inauguration of President Donald Trump. The track featured Trump quotes from his campaign trail and was accompanied by a video depicting Glitoris performing the song in the studio. At the end of the video, the group sing in four-part harmony and are seen urinating on a picture of the president.

In 2017, Glitoris performed at Thrashville festival, shared bills with Frenzal Rhomb and Shonen Knife, as well as performing with Amanda Palmer at the National Carillon. 

At the National Live Music Awards of 2017: Best Live Act (ACT), Best Live Voice (ACT) and Best Hard Rock Act (National).

In 2017, Andrew was endorsed by Vance Custom Guitars and Bareknuckle Pickups. A custom guitar designed for female players, The Glitterbomb SB, was released by the company following a six-month collaboration.

In January–March 2018, Glitoris recorded their debut album The Policy at The Pet Food Factory, Sydney, with Jason Whalley of punk band Frenzal Rhomb. The band headlined Psych Fest, following up with an 8-night residency at the New Zealand Fringe Festival in Wellington. 

 

In July 2018, Glitoris released the single "Spit Hood", a critique of failures in the youth criminal justice system and the over-representation of Aboriginal youth in detention. The track was based on footage shown in the ABC Four Corners documentary Australia's Shame.  

In October 2018 the band released the title track from their debut album The Policy and announced an Australian tour. The Policy was released on 2 November 2018.

In December 2018, Tony announced her departure from the band and Glitoris recruited Scott "ScoMo" on drums.

The band returned in April 2019 to play a rousing set at Groovin' the Moo. 

After a year of successful shows, at the National Live Music Awards of 2019, Glitoris won Hard Rock Live Act of the Year.

2020: "Slut Power"
In February 2020, Glitoris released "Slut Power"- the fourth and final single from their debut album The Policy and announced a 17-date national tour. They performed 2 shows in the Northern Territory - one in Alice Springs and a sold out IWD show at the Railway Club in Darwin - before the rest of the tour was postponed due to COVID-19 pandemic. On Saturday the 13th of June 2020, Glitoris performed 2 socially distanced shows at The Basement in Canberra. A live mini-LP, The Slut Power Sessions - Live at The Basement, featuring recordings from the shows was released in October 2020. Scott left the band in December 2020. The band recruited Michael “Mickey” Glitoris on drums and performed at the Darwin Railway Club on New Year's Eve 2021.

Discography

Albums

Extended plays

Singles

Awards and nominations

National Live Music Awards
The National Live Music Awards (NLMAs) are a broad recognition of Australia's diverse live industry, celebrating the success of the Australian live scene. The awards commenced in 2016.

|-
| National Live Music Awards of 2016
| themselves 
| ACT Live Act of the Year
| 
|-
| National Live Music Awards of 2017
| themselves 
| Live Hard Rock Act of the Year
| 
|-
| National Live Music Awards of 2019
| themselves 
| Live Hard Rock Act of the Year
| 
|-

References 

Australian punk rock groups
Australian Capital Territory musical groups
LGBT-themed musical groups
Musical groups established in 2014
2014 establishments in Australia